Shi Mingde (born December 1954) is a Chinese diplomat who served as Chinese Ambassadors to Austria from 2010 to 2012 and Chinese Ambassadors to Germany from 2012 to 2019.

Biography
Shi was born in Shanghai, in December 1954. In 1972, he was sent to study at the East German Embassy International Student Class. 

After graduating in 1975, he worked at there until 1981, when he became a staff member of the Beijing Diplomatic Service Bureau. In 1986, he was sent to the East Germany again and appointed a secretary. Shi returned to China in 1990 and was assigned to the Department of West European Affairs, Ministry of Foreign Affairs. In 1993, he was made a counsellor of the Chinese Embassy in Germany. In 1997, he was recalled to the Department of West European Affairs and was elevated to deputy director. In 2002, he became counsellor of the Chinese Embassy in Germany for the second time. In 2006, he took office as director of the Policy Research Bureau of the Central Foreign Affairs Office. He was designated by President Hu Jintao in August 2010 to replace Wu Ken as Chinese Ambassadors to Austria according the 11th National People's Congress decision. In August 2012, President Hu Jintao named him Chinese Ambassadors to Germany according the 11th National People's Congress decision, and he held this post from 2012 until 2019.

Personal life
Shi is married and has a son. His wife Xu Jinghua is a German language translator.

References

1954 births
Living people
People from Shanghai
Beijing Foreign Studies University alumni
Ambassadors of China to Austria
Ambassadors of China to Germany